Kolukhi (also Romanized as Kolūkhī) is a village in Quchan Atiq Rural District, in the Central District of Quchan County, Razavi Khorasan Province, Iran. At the 2006 census, its population was 976, in 238 families.

References 

Populated places in Quchan County